The 2021–22 season is Fleetwood Town's 114th year in their history and eighth consecutive season in League One. Along with the league, the club will also compete in the FA Cup, the EFL Cup and the EFL Trophy. The season covers the period from 1 July 2021 to 30 June 2022.

Pre-season friendlies
Fleetwood Town announced friendly matches against Radcliffe, Port Vale, Rochdale, St Johnstone, Huddersfield Town, Leeds United, Chester, Wrexham and Stockport County as part of their pre-season preparations.

Competitions

League One

League table

Results summary

Results by matchday

Matches
Fleetwood Town's fixtures were released on 24 June 2021.

FA Cup

Fleetwood were drawn at home to Burton Albion in the first round.

EFL Cup

Fleetwood Town were drawn at away to Stoke City in the first round.

EFL Trophy

Fleetwood were drawn into Group G off the Northern section alongside Accrington Stanley, Barrow and Leicester City U21s. The group stage matches were confirmed on 29 June.

Transfers

Transfers in

Loans in

Loans out

Transfers out

References

Fleetwood Town
Fleetwood Town F.C. seasons